Adelaide McGuinn Cromwell (November 27, 1919 – June 8, 2019) was an American sociologist and professor emeritus at Boston University, where she co-founded the African Studies Center in 1959, and directed the graduate program in Afro-American studies from 1969 to 1985. She was the first African-American instructor at Hunter College and at Smith College. In 1974 she was appointed as the first African-American Library Commissioner for the Commonwealth of Massachusetts. She has written several books on black history, including a groundbreaking study of Boston's black upper class and a biography of Adelaide Casely-Hayford. She died in June 2019 at the age of 99.

Early life and education 

Adelaide Cromwell was born into a prominent Washington, D.C. family on November 27, 1919. Her grandfather, John Wesley Cromwell, was a well-known civil rights activist and educator, and her father, John Wesley Cromwell Jr., was the city's first black certified public accountant. Her aunt, Otelia Cromwell, was the first black graduate of Smith College, and her cousin, Edward Brooke, was a Senator of Massachusetts and the first popularly elected Black State Attorney General.

Cromwell graduated from Dunbar High School in 1936. She received an A.B. degree in sociology from Smith College in 1940 and an M.A. degree in sociology from the University of Pennsylvania in 1941. She earned a certificate in social casework from Bryn Mawr College, and a Ph.D. in sociology from Radcliffe College in 1946.

Career 

After graduating from Radcliffe, Cromwell taught sociology at Hunter College, where she was the first African-American instructor. She again broke the color line when she taught at Smith College in the late 1940s. In 1951 she joined the faculty at Boston University, where she taught sociology until 1985. In 1959 Cromwell co-founded the university's African Studies Center. From 1969 to 1985 she directed the African-American Studies program.

In 1960, Cromwell traveled to Ghana to convene the first conference of West African social workers. She also served on a committee commissioned by the American Methodist Church to evaluate the state of higher education in the Belgian Congo (now the Democratic Republic of the Congo). She was appointed in 1974 as Library Commissioner for the Commonwealth of Massachusetts, the first African American in this position. In 1983 she convened a conference of policymakers and scholars at the University of Liberia.

Cromwell has served on the executive council of the American Society of African Culture, the now-defunct American Negro Leadership Conference in Africa, and the United States Agency for International Development's Advisory Committee on Voluntary Foreign Aid (ACVFA). She is a member of the Council on Foreign Relations, the African Studies Association, the Association for the Study of African American Life and History (ASALH), and the American Sociological Association.

She is president of the Heritage Guild, which she co-founded in 1975 to document, preserve, and raise awareness of Boston's black history. At that time, few Bostonians realized the historical significance of sites such as the African Meeting House on Beacon Hill, or knew that Boston's West End had once been a major center of the abolitionist movement. The Heritage Guild has called the public's attention to historical sites and the achievements of people such as Butler R. Wilson, founder of the Boston NAACP. Cromwell has written several books on black history, including a study of Boston's black upper class, The Other Brahmins. She was honored by the Massachusetts Historical Commission in 2015 for her contributions.

Selected writings

Books

Articles 
 
 
 
 Barbour, Floyd B., ed. (1970). "Black Education in the Seventies: A Lesson From the Past". The Black Seventies. Porter Sargent Publishers. pp. 51–67.

Honors and awards 
 Citation from the National Order of Côte d'Ivoire
 Smith College Medal 
 Carter G. Woodson Medal from the Association for the Study of African American Life and History
 Honorary degrees from Southeastern Massachusetts University, George Washington University, Boston University, and Smith College
 Historic Preservation Award from the Massachusetts Historical Commission, 2015

References

External links 
 

1919 births
2019 deaths
20th-century American historians
20th-century American women writers
Smith College alumni
University of Pennsylvania alumni
Radcliffe College alumni
Boston University faculty
Smith College faculty
Hunter College faculty
American sociologists
American women sociologists
African-American historians
American women historians
African-American women academics
American women academics
African-American academics
People from Brookline, Massachusetts
Academics from Washington, D.C.
Academics from Massachusetts
Historians from Massachusetts
20th-century African-American women writers
20th-century African-American writers
21st-century African-American people
21st-century African-American women